JingPad A1 is Linux based tablet developed by Jingling. JingPad A1 was released on  2021. Tablet is using its own JingOS Linux distribution which is based on Android hardware layer Halium and KDE Plasma mobile. Ubuntu Touch has been ported to the tablet. The device is using Unisoc Tiger T510 Soc and has 8GB RAM and a max of 256GB storage. It has a pencil and attachable keyboard accessories. 

Reviews said that the device is physically well made but its drivers are unfinished and as being built on top of the Android compatibility layer and not truly open hardware it is unknown what it is target group is.

References

External links 
 JingOS Github pages

Tablet computers introduced in 2021
Linux-based devices